Ethel Haythornthwaite (18 January 1894 – 11 April 1986) was an English environmental campaigner, and a pioneer of the countryside movement. She founded the Sheffield Association for the Protection of Rural Scenery, also known as the Sheffield Association for the Protection of Local Countryside in 1924, which became the local branch of CPRE in 1927, and worked to protect the countryside of the Peak District from development. She forefronted the appeal to save the 747-acre Longshaw Estate from development, and helped acquire land around Sheffield that became its green belt. She was appointed to the UK government’s National Parks Committee, and helped to make the successful case for the National Parks and Access to the Countryside Act of 1949, which led to the founding of the Peak District National Park in 1951. She also helped make green belts part of government policy in 1955.

Early life
Born Ethel Mary Bassett Ward, she was the daughter of a wealthy industrialist, Thomas W. Ward, who built his family a large mansion on Endcliffe Vale Road in Sheffield, Yorkshire. Haythornthwaite grew up in a life of privilege.

During the First World War, she married Henry Burrows Gallimore (in February 1916, when she was 22). In May 1917 Captain Gallimore was killed in the fighting in France. Devastated by his death, she became ill, and her family encouraged her to take restorative walks in the countryside.

Countryside protection
Gallimore soon became enamoured of the rural beauty surrounding the city of Sheffield, and decided to apply herself to protecting the countryside from development and urban sprawl. In 1924 she founded the Sheffield Association for the Protection of Rural Scenery, also known as the Sheffield Association for the Protection of Local Countryside, which in 1927 became the Peak District and South Yorkshire branch of the CPRE (Council for the Preservation of Rural England, later renamed Campaign to Protect Rural England). She was to be secretary of the branch for 56 years from its inception.

In 1928 Gallimore spearheaded an urgent appeal to the Yorkshire public, which helped Peak District and South Yorkshire CPRE to raise the funds to buy the 747-acre Longshaw Estate, which was threatened with development. The Estate was gifted to the National Trust in 1931.

In 1932 she helped acquire a further 448 acres of threatened land at Blacka Moor. In 1938 this became part of Sheffield's Green Belt (the first to be created in England). She also was instrumental in the purchase and protection of other rural areas including Whirlow Moor, Dore Moor, Dovedale, and many other surrounding rural areas.

In 1937 she married Lt Colonel Gerald Graham George Haythornthwaite (1912–1995), another passionate campaigner for the countryside, who worked with her on many of her later projects.

Haythornthwaite wrote, at the start of World War 2 when many of her fellow CPRE administrators were away on active service: "Unquestionably, CPRE and all its branches should strive their best to hold on. If not, much more of England’s beauty will be lost for those who return after the war. I believe our aims are too profoundly important to let go. Those who see what rural England means to the English should work to save it."

Haythornthwaite spent most of 1942 in London, "leading the national organisation in the crucial early debates on how the post-war reconstruction of the country should be achieved by democratic planning". 

In 1945, Haythornthwaite was appointed to the UK government’s National Parks Committee, and her hard work there helped to deliver the 1949 National Parks and Access to the Countryside Act. Much to her delight, and in no small part due to her endeavours, in 1951 the Peak District National Park became the UK's first national park.

In 1955 Haythornthwaite helped form national government policy on Green Belts. She stressed their importance to city dwellers: "My childhood impressions of the city were a gloomy, noisy, shapeless phenomenon. But outside the city – there one began to live. The escape into clean air, the gradual return to nature – with this came satisfaction, peace, freedom, solitude, excitement. One grew to become conscious of its profounder value, something beyond health and high spirits – something to worship."

Haythornthwaite died in 1986; her second husband Gerald died in 1995.

Legacy

In his introduction to the 2001 book Protecting the Beautiful Frame by Melvyn Jones, Sir Chris Bonington wrote “Whatever else is forgotten, the Branch [Peak District and South Yorkshire branch of the CPRE] will go down in history as a major force in environmental conservation because of the achievement of its two ‘grand purposes’: the designation of a national park in the Peak District and the creation of a permanent Sheffield Green Belt. But there were so many more equally successful campaigns in the wider countryside and urban fringe that the reader gasps with admiration. And at the head of this crusading society for so long, the tireless, single-minded, and selfless Ethel and Gerald Haythornthwaite were without parallel. We shall not see the likes of Ethel and Gerald again.”

In celebration of Britain's first National Park, the Friends of the Peak District launched the Peak District Boundary Walk on 17 June 2017. The route broadly follows the park's boundary, as envisaged by Ethel and Gerald.

As part of the 2018 Heritage Open Days in Sheffield, two talks were given about Haythornthwaite's life and work. 

On 7 April 2019 Haythornthwaite and her important work in the Peak District and around Sheffield was featured in the BBC1 television programme Countryfile.

In 2021 a list of 95 hills in the Peak District was named The Ethels in her honour.

References

Further reading
A People's Charter?: 40 Years of the National Parks and Access to the Countryside Act, 1949, John Blunden and Nigel Curry, 1990
The Making of Sheffield, Melvyn Jones, 2004
Sheffield Troublemakers: Rebels and Radicals in Sheffield History, David Price, 2011

External links
 2018 talks about Ethel Haythornthwaite

1894 births
1986 deaths
Peak District
British women environmentalists